Olivier Janzac (born 2 January 1980), born in Toulouse, France, is a French rugby league head coach of Villeneuve Leopards in the French Elite One Championship rugby league competition. He previously played for New York Knights in the AMNRL. He has also played for the France national rugby league team.

Coaching career
On 9 March 2021 it was reported that Olivier had been appointed as head coach of Villeneuve Leopards following the dismissal of Fabien Devecchi, who remains at the club albeit in a different role.

References

External links 
http://www.newyorkknightsrugby.com/profiles_42.php

1980 births
Living people
Expatriate rugby league players in the United States
France national rugby league team players
French expatriate rugby league players
French expatriate sportspeople in the United States
French rugby league players
Lézignan Sangliers players
New York Knights players
Toulouse Olympique players
Villeneuve Leopards coaches